Persiss stands for Persatuan Sepakbola Indonesia Seluruh Sorong (en: Football Association of Indonesia of All Sorong). Persiss Sorong is an Indonesian football club based in Sorong Regency, Southwest Papua. Club is playing in the Liga 3.

Persiss are rivals of the club Persikos Sorong City.

Persiss is the first club defended by Solossa brothers (Boaz Solossa, Ortizan Solossa and Nehemia Solossa).

References

External links
Liga-Indonesia.co.id

Football clubs in Indonesia
Football clubs in Southwest Papua
Association football clubs established in 1970
1970 establishments in Indonesia